Vitomir Lukić (Zelenika September 24, 1929 - Sarajevo, May 30, 1991),  was a Yugoslav prose writer and pedagogue, considered to be one of the greatest writers to emerge from Bosnia and Herzegovina in the 20th century.

Works

 "Soba za prolaznike" (Short stories, 1965, second edition 1997)
 "Album" (Novel, 1968)
 "Praznik stvari" (Poems, 1969)
 "Zaustavljeni kalendar" (Short stories and other prose works, 1970)
 "Životinje, ljudi" (Short stories and other prose works, 1973),
 "Sanovnik nasmijane duše" (Prose work, 1976, second edition 1997)
 "Seansa" (Short stories, 1981)
 "Noćni ekspres" (Selected works, 1984/85)
 "Hodnici svijetlog praha" (Novel, 1989)
 "Odlazak starog rezbara" (Short stories and other prose works, 2005)

References

1929 births
1991 deaths
Bosnia and Herzegovina writers
People from Herceg Novi
Yugoslav writers
20th-century male writers
Bosnia and Herzegovina people of Montenegrin descent
Croats of Bosnia and Herzegovina